Gabriel Sebastian Tamaș (born 9 November 1983) is a Romanian professional footballer who plays as a centre-back for Liga II club Concordia Chiajna.

Tamaș started out as a senior at FC Brașov in the 1998–99 season, and is a journeyman who has since represented eighteen other teams throughout his career. In addition to his native country, he has played in Turkey, Russia, Spain, France, England and Israel, respectively. Tamaș won seven domestic trophies combined with rival sides Dinamo București and FCSB in Romania, with which he had multiple spells, and his honours also include the Israel State Cup and the Israeli Super Cup with Hapoel Haifa.

A Romanian international for 15 years, Tamaș totalled 67 caps and three goals for the nation and was chosen in the squad for the UEFA Euro 2008.

Club career

Early career
Tamaș began his senior career in the second league with hometown clubs FC Brașov and Tractorul Brașov. He transferred to Divizia A team Dinamo București in the summer of 2002, spending a season in the capital before earning a move abroad to Turkish side Galatasaray.

Spartak Moscow, Auxerre and various loans
Tamaș moved to Russian Premier League club Spartak Moscow in January 2004, but after playing 15 matches he returned to Dinamo București in the summer on a one-and-a-half-year loan. Tamaș again moved out on loan to Spanish team Celta Vigo for the 2006–07 season.

At the start of the following campaign, Tamaș signed for Auxerre in the Ligue 1. After his first year in France, he again returned to Dinamo București on a season-long loan. His deal was extended for another year and was also elected captain by his teammates.

His third stint at Dinamo was interrupted prematurely in December 2009, and he signed on loan for West Bromwich Albion on 1 January 2010. Tamaș made his debut on 8 January, in a 1–3 Football League Championship loss to Nottingham Forest. He scored his first goal in a 1–1 draw at Reading, on 27 March.

England and FCSB
On 19 May 2010, Tamaș signed a three-year contract with the option of another year for West Bromwich Albion. On 11 September 2011, he elbowed James Vaughan in the face inside his own penalty area in a match against Norwich City; the referee gave no penalty, but Tamaș was handed a three-match ban for violent conduct. He terminated his contract with WBA by mutual consent in September 2013. The following month, he only spent a week at CFR Cluj after being dismissed because of an incident in a bar.

On 17 January 2014, Tamaș continued in England by signing for Doncaster Rovers. Upon the expiry of his contract, he moved to Watford on a one-year agreement effective from 1 July 2014. After nursing a cruciate knee ligament injury for several months, he left Watford in January 2015. On 15 January 2015, Tamaș signed a two-year contract with FC Steaua București—the cross-town rival of his former club Dinamo—but only made ten league appearances in the remainder of the campaign before leaving.

On 26 August 2015, Tamaș returned to the Football League Championship with Cardiff City on a one-year contract with the option of a further year. During the first half of the season, Tamaș only appeared for the development squad and wasn't involved in the first-team trainings starting from November, resulting in his frustration and claiming he wanted to leave the Welsh capital. He eventually made his debut in a 0–1 FA Cup loss to Shrewsbury Town on 10 January.

On 1 February 2016, Cardiff City announced that his contract was terminated by mutual consent. Tamaș then returned to Steaua București on the condition that he would address his alcohol issues and attend Church on Sundays.

Late career
Between 2017 and 2019, Tamaș featured for Israeli Premier League team Hapoel Haifa, where he aided to two domestic honours. During the latter year, he returned to Romania with Astra Giurgiu, and has also had spells with Universitatea Cluj, Voluntari. Petrolul Ploiești and Concordia Chiajna.

International career
Tamaș was handed his Romania national team debut by Anghel Iordănescu on 12 February 2003, coming on as a substitute for Cosmin Contra in the 90+1st minute of a 2–1 friendly defeat of Slovakia. After appearing in five games at the 2006 FIFA World Cup qualifiers, manager Victor Pițurcă chose him as a starter in all ten matches of the successful UEFA Euro 2008 qualifiers, where Romania finished first in its group. He scored two goals, one in a 2–1 away victory against Slovenia and one in a 6–1 home victory over Albania.

On 25 March 2008, Tamaș was decorated by Romanian president Traian Băsescu for his performances in the Euro 2008 qualifiers; he received Medalia "Meritul Sportiv" – ("The Sportive Merit" Medal) class III. He featured in all three matches at the final tournament, as his nation left the competition in the group stage after two draws with France and Italy and a loss to the Netherlands.

Tamaș played four games at the 2010 World Cup qualifiers, and scored his last goal for the national team in a 3–2 friendly loss to Ukraine in Lviv, on 29 May 2010. In the following years, he amassed eight caps at the Euro 2012 qualifiers, four at the 2014 World Cup qualifiers and two at the Euro 2016 qualifiers. His last two appearances were in 2018, being called up by his former teammate Cosmin Contra for the inaugural season of the Nations League. Tamaș played in a 2–1 away victory over Lithuania and in a goalless draw with Serbia, receiving a red card in the 44th minute of the latter game.

Controversies

Tamaș is known for his controversial lifestyle outside the football pitch, his numerous nights of drinking out and provoking fights or material damages often making the headlines of Romanian media.

In October 2003, Tamaș was involved in a fight in a nightclub in his native Brașov, with the man he fought needing hospitalisation and a surgery to the face. In November 2004, he devastated a Poiana Brașov restaurant together with a group of friends after they were denied entrance. In November 2005, after playing for Dinamo București in a 1–1 draw with Jiul Petroșani, Tamaș went to party in a nightclub in Brașov and caused a scandal, nearly starting a fight.

On 14 February 2009, Tamaș was expelled to the reserves of Dinamo București after drinking alcohol and causing a scandal in the team's training camp in Turkey. In July 2010, he got intoxicated and started a fight with the waiters at his brother's wedding. In December that year, he phisically abused his then-girlfriend in a nightclub in Bucharest after accusing her of infidelity.

In June 2011, he overslept and missed the flight for the national team's tournament in South America after partying until dawn in a nightclub in Poiana Brașov. On 11 August that year, Tamaș and his teammate Adrian Mutu were excluded from the Romania squad after they were caught drinking in a bar the previous night, while the national team was preparing for a friendly match against San Marino. Their suspension was lifted after three games.

In May 2013, after partying in a Bucharest nightclub, Tamaș tried to enter a block of flats for shelter. The cleaning lady denied him access, so he broke in the door, went up to the first floor and fell asleep on the stairway. He was taken to the police station, where he caused a scandal by yelling at and insulting the officers. He received an eight-month suspended sentence for his acts.

In October 2013, Tamaș was drinking in a bar in Bucharest with his national team colleague Daniel Pancu, and later that night they started fighting each other. One week later, he signed a one-year contract with CFR Cluj, but the club dismissed him shortly after he and his teammate Florin Costea caused an incident in a local pub. On the night of the 2014 New Year's Eve, Tamaș got into a fight in the lobby of a restaurant in Brașov.

During his first spell at FC Steaua București, he was dismissed after missing a training session following a night out; manager Mirel Rădoi stated that Tamaș lied to him by claiming that his phone alarm did not ring. On 23 March 2019, during his time in Israel, Tamaș was arrested by the police after driving his car at 205 km/h, having a 0.66 mg of alcohol per liter of exhaled air. He spent a week in jail, after which he stayed in house arrest for a month and was sentenced to two months of community service.

In October 2022, whilst drinking along with several Petrolul Ploiești teammates at a restaurant, Tamaș called their manager Nicolae Constantin on his phone and criticised his tactics. He also cursed chairman Costel Lazăr, sporting director Claudiu Tudor and the fans of Petrolul, and Constantin sent the recording to the leaders of supporter groups. The recording found its way into the media and Tamaș left the club the following days.

Career statistics

Club

International

Scores and results list Romania's goal tally first, score column indicates score after each Tamaș goal.

Honours
Dinamo București
Cupa României: 2002–03, 2004–05
Supercupa României: 2005

Spartak Moscow
Russian Super Cup runner-up: 2006

FCSB
Liga I: 2014–15
Cupa României: 2014–15
Supercupa României runner-up: 2015
Cupa Ligii: 2014–15, 2015–16

Hapoel Haifa
Israel State Cup: 2017–18
Israeli Super Cup: 2018

Voluntari
Cupa României runner-up: 2021–22

Individual
Romanian Defender of the Year: 2016

References

External links

1983 births
Living people
Sportspeople from Brașov
Romanian footballers
Association football defenders
FC Brașov (1936) players
FC Dinamo București players
Galatasaray S.K. footballers
FC Spartak Moscow players
RC Celta de Vigo players
AJ Auxerre players
West Bromwich Albion F.C. players
CFR Cluj players
Doncaster Rovers F.C. players
Watford F.C. players
FC Steaua București players
Cardiff City F.C. players
Hapoel Haifa F.C. players
FC Astra Giurgiu players
FC Universitatea Cluj players
FC Petrolul Ploiești players
CS Concordia Chiajna players
Liga I players
Liga II players
Süper Lig players
Russian Premier League players
La Liga players
Ligue 1 players
Israeli Premier League players
English Football League players
Premier League players
Romania youth international footballers
Romania under-21 international footballers
Romania international footballers
UEFA Euro 2008 players
Romanian expatriate footballers
Expatriate footballers in Turkey
Expatriate footballers in Russia
Expatriate footballers in France
Expatriate footballers in Spain
Expatriate footballers in England
Expatriate footballers in Israel
Romanian expatriate sportspeople in Turkey
Romanian expatriate sportspeople in Russia
Romanian expatriate sportspeople in France
Romanian expatriate sportspeople in Spain
Romanian expatriate sportspeople in England
Romanian expatriate sportspeople in Israel